The white-throated babbler (Argya gularis) is a species of bird in the family Leiothrichidae.
It is endemic to Myanmar.

This species was formerly placed in the genus Turdoides but following the publication of a comprehensive molecular phylogenetic study in 2018, it was moved to the resurrected genus Argya.

References

Collar, N. J. & Robson, C. 2007. Family Timaliidae (Babblers)  pp. 70 – 291 in; del Hoyo, J., Elliott, A. & Christie, D.A. eds. Handbook of the Birds of the World, Vol. 12. Picathartes to Tits and Chickadees. Lynx Edicions, Barcelona.

white-throated babbler
Endemic birds of Myanmar
white-throated babbler
white-throated babbler
Taxonomy articles created by Polbot
Taxobox binomials not recognized by IUCN